"With Pen in Hand" is a song written by Bobby Goldsboro and first released on his March 1968 album, Honey.  The song's lyrics address the subjects of divorce and losing custody of one's child, and are sung from the perspective of the parent who expects to be losing custody of their child, as they make a final plea to their spouse to reconcile before the divorce is finalized. "With Pen in Hand" has been a hit for multiple artists in the late 1960 and 1970s.

Johnny Darrell version
The first single release of "With Pen in Hand" was by Johnny Darrell on April 13, 1968. Darrell's version reached No. 3 on Billboards Hot Country Singles chart, No. 2 on Record Worlds "Top C&W Singles", No. 4 on the Cash Box Country Top 50, No. 126 on Billboards Bubbling Under the Hot 100 chart, and No. 12 on Cash Boxs "Looking Ahead" chart of singles with potential of entering the Cash Box Top 100. He also released it on his August 1968 album also called With Pen in Hand.

Billy Vera version
In June 1968, Billy Vera released a version of the song, which was his first solo single. Vera's version spent 6 weeks on the Billboard Hot 100, reaching No. 43, while reaching No. 25 on Billboards Easy Listening chart, No. 25 on the Cash Box Top 100, No. 29 on Record Worlds "100 Top Pops", No. 21 on Record Worlds "Top Non-Rock" chart, No. 12 on Canada's RPM 100, and No. 20 on Record Worlds "Juke Box Top 25".

Vikki Carr version

Vikki Carr, who has said: "I had to fight for 'With Pen in Hand', had a 15 November 1968 UK single release with a cover of the song. Carr, herself in London at the time recording a TV show, promoted the single on British television and radio, facilitating its charting at No. 39 on the UK Singles Chart.

Also in November 1968, Carr played the Manhattan nightclub Persian Room, with her engagement being recorded as the live album For Once in My Life, from which her performance of "With Pen In Hand" was issued as a single in February 1969. It spent 13 weeks on the Billboard Hot 100, peaking at No. 35, becoming Carr's third and final Top 40 hit on that chart. It also reached No. 6 on Billboards Easy Listening chart, and was ranked No. 5 on Billboards year-end ranking of 1969's "Top Easy Listening Singles".

In Canada, Carr's live version reached No. 38 on the RPM 100, and No. 4 on RPMs Adult Contemporary chart.

The B-side of both the UK and US single versions of "With Pen in Hand" featured Carr's version of "Can't Take My Eyes Off You", from the album It Must Be Him.

In 1970, Carr was nominated for a Grammy Award for Best Female Pop Vocal Performance for her live rendition of "With Pen in Hand".

Chart performance

Bobby Goldsboro version
Goldsboro first recorded the song February 26, 1968 and released the song on his March 1968 album, Honey, but he didn't release it as a single until August 1, 1972. Goldsboro's version spent 5 weeks on the 1972 Billboard Hot 100, reaching No. 94, while reaching No. 28 on Billboards Easy Listening chart, No. 87 on the Cash Box Top 100, and No. 92 on Record Worlds "The Singles Chart".

Other versions
In 1968, Jerry Vale released a version of the song as a single and on the album This Guy's In Love With You. Vale's version reached No. 30 on Billboards Easy Listening chart and No. 23 on Record Worlds "Top Non-Rock" chart.

Conway Twitty released the song on the album Next in Line in 1968.

Aretha Franklin released the song on the album Let Me in Your Life in 1974.  

In 1977, Dorothy Moore released a version of the song as a single and on her eponymous album. Moore's version reached No. 12 on Billboards Hot Soul Singles chart, No. 101 on Billboards Bubbling Under the Hot 100 chart, No. 92 on Record Worlds "The Singles Chart", and No. 11 on Record Worlds "The R&B Singles Chart", No. 103 on Cash Boxs "Looking Ahead" chart, and No. 15 on "Cash Box Top 100 R&B".

References 

1968 songs
1968 singles
1972 singles
1977 singles
Billy Vera songs
Bobby Goldsboro songs
Jerry Vale songs
Johnny Darrell songs
Vikki Carr songs
Dorothy Moore songs
United Artists Records singles
Atlantic Records singles
Liberty Records singles
Songs written by Bobby Goldsboro
Song recordings produced by Bob Montgomery (songwriter)
Songs about divorce
Songs about children